Gregor Richard Weiss (born February 18, 1941) is an American artistic gymnast. He represented the United States at the 1964 Summer Olympics, placing 7th in the team event and 59th in the individual all-around. He was a member of the U.S. team at the 1966 World Artistic Gymnastics Championships. In the NCAA, he competed for Penn State University and was the NCAA all-around champion in 1961. He was inducted into the U.S. Gymnastics Hall of Fame in 1991.

A resident of Ridgefield, New Jersey, Weiss graduated from Dwight Morrow High School in nearby Englewood.

Following his graduation from Penn State, Weiss served in the U.S. Air Force while still competing internationally and coached at the United States Air Force Academy. He is the father of Michael Weiss.

See also
List of Pennsylvania State University Olympians

References

 
 
 
 
 

1941 births
Living people
American male artistic gymnasts
Gymnasts at the 1964 Summer Olympics
Olympic gymnasts of the United States
Penn State Nittany Lions men's gymnasts
Pan American Games medalists in gymnastics
Pan American Games gold medalists for the United States
Pan American Games silver medalists for the United States
United States Air Force officers
Dwight Morrow High School alumni
People from Ridgefield, New Jersey
Sportspeople from Bergen County, New Jersey
Sportspeople from Newark, New Jersey
Gymnasts at the 1959 Pan American Games
Medalists at the 1959 Pan American Games
Military personnel from New Jersey